Ford Heights (formerly East Chicago Heights) is a village and a suburb of Chicago in Cook County, Illinois, United States. The population was 1,813 at the 2020 census. Many of the area’s first settlers were African American and since its incorporation in 1949 the village has remained predominantly Black. Due to the lack of commercial activity and financial stability, the village has declined over the years. Urban renewal efforts were attempted in the 1960s, although the village has continued to decline.

Geography

The village lies on the edge of the Tinley Moraine.

Surrounding areas
 Glenwood 
 Chicago Heights    Lynwood
 Chicago Heights   Lynwood
 Chicago Heights    Sauk Village
 Sauk Village

History
The area that would eventually become Ford Heights was first settled in the late 1840s. It served as a stopping point on the Underground Railroad for runaway slaves fleeing to freedom. By the early 20th century, the area had developed into an agricultural community of farms operated mostly by Poles, Lithuanians, and Italians. After World War I, African Americans from the Southern U.S. migrated to the area and worked on the farms.

A new subdivision known as the "Park Addition" was created on a farm road from Chicago Heights to Indiana, and it attracted residents to the area during the early 1920s. In 1924, 40 families successfully petitioned for electrical service. Soon after, the main east–west road became a two-lane concrete highway designated as U.S. Route 30, part of the transcontinental Lincoln Highway. By the 1930s, the Park Addition had telephone service and was known as East Chicago Heights. During the 1940s, Alberta Armstrong and others organized both black and white women in the community to raise funds for a new fire truck. By 1948, they had become the East Chicago Heights Citizens Association.

East Chicago Heights was incorporated as a village in 1949. In the 1950 census, 1,548 people lived in the village – 76.9% of whom were black. The Ford Motor Company opened a stamping plant adjacent to the village in 1956. The company offered minorities an equal opportunity for well-paying jobs, and East Chicago Heights developed into a blue-collar community inhabited mostly by middle-class black families whose housing choices in suburban Chicago were severely limited at that time. The village's population more than doubled to 3,270 by 1960. That growth continued throughout the decade, with one of the biggest successes being the Sunnyfield subdivision, which opened in 1964 and became one of the most popular neighborhoods in East Chicago Heights.

These developments attracted lower income residents to East Chicago Heights, which strained the village's resources, already limited by little commercial activity and a small tax base. The population rose to 5,000 in 1970 and peaked at 5,347 in 1980. In an attempt to annex the unincorporated site of the Ford Stamping Plant, the village of East Chicago Heights changed its name to Ford Heights in 1987. The move was unsuccessful, and the land eventually was annexed by the neighboring city of Chicago Heights.

Often viewed as one of Chicago's most impoverished suburbs and at one point the poorest suburb in the United States, Ford Heights has experienced high levels of political corruption, decaying infrastructure, and an elevated crime rate. In 2008, the Cook County Sheriff's Department took over law enforcement duties for the village. Between 1980 and 2010, the population of Ford Heights declined by more than 48%.

Demographics
As of the 2020 census there were 1,813 people, 885 households, and 567 families residing in the village. The racial makeup of the village was 91.73% African American, 2.81% White, 0.50% Native American, 0.22% Asian, 0.00% Pacific Islander, 2.04% from other races, and 2.70% from two or more races. Hispanic or Latino of any race were 3.70% of the population.

There were 885 households, out of which 57.40% had children under the age of 18 living with them, 13.33% were married couples living together, 42.82% had a female householder with no husband present, and 35.93% were non-families. 30.51% of all households were made up of individuals, and 13.67% had someone living alone who was 65 years of age or older. The average household size was 4.05 and the average family size was 3.06.

The village's age distribution consisted of 24.6% under the age of 18, 5.9% from 18 to 24, 26.2% from 25 to 44, 28.1% from 45 to 64, and 15.1% who were 65 years of age or older. The median age was 39.0 years. For every 100 females, there were 87.8 males. For every 100 females age 18 and over, there were 80.9 males.

The median income for a household in the village was $37,083, and the median income for a family was $40,082. Males had a median income of $22,263 versus $33,819 for females. The per capita income for the village was $17,494. About 36.9% of families and 37.8% of the population were below the poverty line, including 66.2% of those under age 18 and 18.1% of those age 65 or over.
{| class="wikitable"
|+Ford Heights, Illinois - Demographic Profile (NH = Non-Hispanic)
!Race / Ethnicity
!Pop 2010
!Pop 2020
!% 2010
!% 2020
|-
|Black or African American alone (NH)
|2,635
|1,651
|95.37%
|91.06%
|-
|White alone (NH)
|40
|44
|1.45%
|2.43%
|-
|Native American or Alaska Native alone (NH)
|6
|7
|0.22%
|0.39%
|-
|Asian alone (NH)
|3
|4
|0.11%
|0.22%
|-
|Pacific Islander alone (NH)
|0
|0
|0.00%
|0.00%
|-
|Some Other Race alone (NH)
|0
|3
|0.00%
|0.17%
|-
|Mixed Race/Multi-Racial (NH)
|37
|37
|1.34%
|2.04%
|-
|Hispanic or Latino (any race)
|42
|67
|1.52%
|3.70%
|-
|Total|2,763|1,813|100.00%|100.00%'''
|}Note: the US Census treats Hispanic/Latino as an ethnic category. This table excludes Latinos from the racial categories and assigns them to a separate category. Hispanics/Latinos can be of any race.''

Government
Ford Heights is in Illinois's 2nd congressional district.

Education
Public education in the village of Ford Heights is provided by Ford Heights School District 169 and Bloom Township High School District 206: Ford Heights School District 169 operates two campuses: Medgar Evers Primary Academic Center (grades PK-4) and Cottage Grove Upper Grade Center (grades 5-8). High school students in Ford Heights attend Bloom Trail High School, which is part of Bloom Township High School District 206.

References

External links
 Ford Heights Community Profile - Illinois Department of Commerce and Economic Opportunity

 
Villages in Illinois
Villages in Cook County, Illinois
Chicago metropolitan area
Populated places established in 1924
Populated places on the Underground Railroad
1949 establishments in Illinois
Majority-minority cities and towns in Cook County, Illinois